The Parliamentary Under-Secretary of State for Wales, often referred to simply as the Welsh Office Minister, is a junior ministerial post (of Parliamentary Under-Secretary of State rank) in the Government of the United Kingdom, supporting the Secretary of State for Wales.

History
A post of Minister of Welsh Affairs was created in 1951 under the Home Secretary and was upgraded to Minister of State level in 1954. On 17 October 1964 The post was further upgraded to Secretary of State for Wales, which was a cabinet level role, being assisted by a junior minister.

Between 1964 and the establishment of devolution in 1999 there were regularly two junior ministers within the Welsh Office, often but not always consisting of a Minister of State and a Parliamentary Under-Secretary of State, with each assigned specific roles (health, education etc.). Following devolution and the transfer of powers from Westminster to the National Assembly, there was only one Under-Secretary of State working directly with the Secretary of State.

A second (and unpaid) Parliamentary Under-Secretary of State role was created in 2012 during the Coalition Government with one minister serving in the Commons and one in the Lords. This situation was maintained following the 2015 general election with two Under-Secretaries of State, one being paid by the Welsh Office and one unpaid (or paid by another government department for a joint role). Following the appointment of Boris Johnson as Prime Minister, Nick Bourne resigned and no replacement Minister was appointed.

Ministers of Welsh Affairs (1951–1964)
For a list of Ministers of Welsh Affairs see: Ministers of Welsh Affairs (1951–1964)

Minister of State for Wales in the House of Commons (1964–1999)
1964–1966 Goronwy Roberts
1966–1969 Ifor Davies
1967–1970 Eirene White
1970–1974 David Gibson-Watt
1974–1983 None. Two Under-Secretary of States for Wales existed, see below
1983–1987 John Stradling Thomas 
1987–1994 Wyn Roberts
1994–1999 None. Two Under-Secretary of States for Wales were created, see below

Parliamentary Under-Secretary of Wales in the House of Commons (1974–1999)

1974–1976 Alec Jones & Barry Jones
1976–1979 Alec Jones & Edward Rowlands
1979–1983 Wyn Roberts & Michael Roberts
1983–1985 Wyn Roberts & John Stradling Thomas
1985–1987 Wyn Roberts & Mark Robinson
15 June 1987 - 28 November 1990 Ian Grist
3 December 1990 - 20 July 1992 Nicholas Bennett
20 July 1994 – 2 June 1996 Gwilym Jones & Rod Richards
2 June 1996 – 2 May 1997 Gwilym Jones & Jonathan Evans 
 2 May 1997 – 28 July 1998 and Peter Hain and Win Griffiths
 29 July 1998 – 29 July 1999 Peter Hain and Jon Owen Jones

Junior Welsh Office Ministers in the House of Commons (1999–present)

Colour key

Parliamentary Under-Secretary of Wales in the House of Commons (1999–present)

Junior Welsh Office Ministers in the House of Lords (2012–present)

Colour key

Notes 
1.Promoted to Minister of State in 1987.

References

See also
 Under-Secretary of State for Scotland
 Secretary of State for Wales
 First Minister for Wales

Government of Wales
Politics of Wales
1964 establishments in Wales
1964 establishments in the United Kingdom